The 2014–15 Toronto Maple Leafs season was the 98th season for the National Hockey League franchise that was established on November 22, 1917. This was the second year of the new alignment and schedule format. Toronto again played every team in their own division at least four times, every team in the Metropolitan Division of the Eastern Conference three times, and every team from the Western Conference twice. To complete the 82-game schedule, they played both Ottawa and Detroit five times.

On March 23, 2015, a 13-year long sellout streak ended; only 18,336 fans showed up for the evening match against the Minnesota Wild. Ticket prices for the game were reduced earlier in the day.

Despite remaining in the playoff hunt for the first half of the season, the Leafs finished the season with only 68 points, tied for the fewest earned since the NHL began playing 82 games per season in the 1995-96 season. The day after the regular season ended, April 12, 2015, Maple Leafs president Brendan Shanahan kept good on his promise of a scorched earth rebuild, as general manager Dave Nonis and interim head coach Peter Horachek were terminated from their positions. Also terminated were coaches Steve Spott, Chris Dennis and Rick St. Croix; director of player development Jim Hughes and director of pro scouting Steve Kasper, as well as Rob Cowie and 18 other scouts. Later in the day, strength and conditioning coach Anthony Belza
was fired.

On May 20, 2015, the Toronto Maple Leafs announced that Mike Babcock would be the team's new head coach, signing him to an eight-year, $50 million contract.

Off-season
On May 8, 2014, general manager Dave Nonis announced that Randy Carlyle had accepted a contract extension to continue as head coach through the 2016–17 season, however Carlyle's assistant coaches, Greg Cronin, Scott Gordon and Dave Farrish were all released by the team.

On July 22, 2014, Brendan Shanahan let go former assistant general managers Claude Loiselle and Dave Poulin and named Kyle Dubas as the new assistant general manager. At the time of the hire, Dubas was 28 years old. He was formerly the general manager of the Ontario Hockey League's Sault Ste. Marie Greyhounds.

Many players were signed, lost and traded during free agency. See Transactions for a list of lost and acquired players.

Standings

Record vs opponents

(* game decided in overtime or shoot-out)

Suspensions/fines

Schedule and results

Pre-season

Regular season

Overtime statistics

Player statistics
Final stats

Skaters

Goaltenders

†Denotes player spent time with another team before joining the Maple Leafs. Stats reflect time with the Maple Leafs only.
‡Denotes player was traded mid-season. Stats reflect time with the Maple Leafs only.
Bold/italics denotes franchise record.

Notable achievements

Awards

Milestones

Transactions
The Maple Leafs have been involved in the following transactions during the 2014–15 season.

Trades

Free agents acquired

Free agents lost

Claimed via waivers

Lost via waivers

Lost via retirement

Player signings

Other

Despite the Leafs usual loyal fan base, there have been several occurrences in the 2014–15 season where fans have thrown Leafs jerseys onto the ice to show disgust for horrid team performance. It has been said that this action is "classless" and "disrespectful" by many, as well as dangerous for players who have the potential to get hurt from skating over top of the jerseys. Fans who take part in this action can be faced with a hefty fine as well as being banned from all Air Canada Centre events for one year.

Draft picks

The 2014 NHL Entry Draft was held on June 27–28, 2014 at the Wells Fargo Center in Philadelphia, Pennsylvania.

Draft notes
 The Toronto Maple Leafs' second-round pick went to the Anaheim Ducks as the result of a trade on November 16, 2013, that sent Peter Holland and Brad Staubitz to Toronto in exchange for Jesse Blacker, Anaheim's seventh round pick in 2014 and this pick (being conditional at the time of the trade). The condition – Anaheim would receive a second-round pick in 2014 if Holland played in 25 or more games for the Maple Leafs during the 2013–14 season – was converted on January 18, 2014.
 The Toronto Maple Leafs' fourth-round pick went to the Chicago Blackhawks as the result of a trade June 30, 2013, that sent Dave Bolland to Toronto in exchange for a second-round pick in 2013, Anaheim's fourth round pick in 2013 and this pick.
 The Arizona Coyotes' fourth round pick went to the Toronto Maple Leafs as the result of a trade on January 16, 2013, that sent Matthew Lombardi to Phoenix in exchange for this pick (being conditional at the time of the trade). The condition – If Lombardi did not re-sign with Phoenix for the 2013–14 season, then Toronto would receive a fourth-round pick in 2014 – was converted on August 29, 2013.

Notes

References

Toronto Maple Leafs seasons
Toronto
Toronto